Wick Burghs, sometimes known as Northern Burghs, was a constituency of the House of Commons of the Parliament of the United Kingdom from 1832 to 1918. It elected one Member of Parliament (MP) by the first past the post voting system.

A similar constituency had been known as Tain Burghs from 1708 to 1832.

Boundaries
The constituency was a district of burghs representing the parliamentary burghs of Cromarty, Dingwall, Dornoch, Kirkwall, Tain and Wick. Apart from Cromarty, these burghs had been previously components of Tain Burghs. In 1918 Dornoch and Wick were merged into Caithness and Sutherland, Kirkwall into Orkney and Shetland and Cromarty, Dingwall and Tain into Ross and Cromarty.
The first election in Wick Burghs was in 1832. The franchise was extended to wider groups of the population than under the old system of burgh councillors electing a burgh commissioner to participate in the election. From 1832 the votes from each burgh were added together to establish the result.

Members of Parliament

Elections

Elections in the 1830s

Elections in the 1840s

Elections in the 1850s

Elections in the 1860s
Laing resigned after being appointed a member of the Council of India, causing a by-election.

Elections in the 1870s
Loch resigned, causing a by-election.

Elections in the 1880s

Cameron was supported by the Highland Land League, and ally of the Crofter MPs.

Elections in the 1890s

Pender's resignation caused a by-election.

Elections in the 1900s

Elections in the 1910s

See also 
 List of former Parliamentary constituencies in the United Kingdom

Notes and references

Sources 
 The House of Commons 1754-1790, by Sir Lewis Namier and John Brooke (HMSO 1964)
 British Parliamentary Election Results 1832-1885, compiled and edited by F. W. S. Craig (The Macmillan Press 1997)
 Chronology of British Parliamentary By-elections 1833-1987, compiled and edited by F. W. S. Craig (Parliamentary Research Services 1987)
 British Parliamentary Election Results 1885-1918, compiled and edited by F.W.S. Craig (Macmillan Press 1974)
 Boundaries of Parliamentary Constituencies 1885-1972, compiled and edited by F.W.S. Craig (Parliamentary Reference Publications 1972)

Debrett's House of Commons and Judicial Bench, 1889 (for 1885 and 1886 results)
Whitaker's Almanack, 1907 (for 1906 results)

Historic parliamentary constituencies in Scotland (Westminster)
Constituencies of the Parliament of the United Kingdom established in 1832
Constituencies of the Parliament of the United Kingdom disestablished in 1918
Politics of the county of Caithness
Politics of the county of Cromarty
Politics of Orkney
Politics of the county of Ross
Politics of the county of Ross and Cromarty
Politics of the county of Sutherland